Ahmed Mohamed Obsiye, was a Somalian politician. And senior member of the Somali Youth League, he served as speaker of the Somali Parliament during the Somali Republic's early civilian administration. He hails from Adan Issa subdivisions of the Issa Musse subclan of the Isaaq Somali.

References

External links
Federal Parliament of Somalia - Members

Somali Youth League politicians
Speakers of the Parliament of Somalia
1914 births
1984 deaths
People from Hargeisa